Tamara Isabel Falcó Preysler, 6th Marchioness of Griñón (born 20 November 1981), is a Spanish aristocrat and reality television participant. She was also a co-host on the television show El Hormiguero. She is the only child of aristocrat Carlos Falcó, 12th Marquess of Castel-Moncayo, GE with Filipino socialite Isabel Preysler.

Early life and education 
Tamara Isabel Falcó Preysler was born on 20 November 1981 in Madrid, Spain, as the only daughter from the marriage of Carlos Falcó y Fernández de Córdoba and María Isabel Preysler Arrastia. Her parents wed in 1980, both for the second time. Griñón's parents separated in 1985 with both also remarrying after. From her parents' other marriages, Griñón has eight half-siblings, including Manolo, 13th Marquess of Castel-Moncayo, Alejandra, 13th Marchioness of Mirabel, and singer Enrique Iglesias. 

Griñón attended Lake Forest College in Lake Forest, Illinois and majored in communication. After an internship at Inditex, she attended Istituto Marangoni in Milan to study fashion. She also holds a Masters in Visual Merchandising from the University of Navarra.

Career 
In 2013, Griñón starred in her own reality television series lady Tamara for one season. Since then, she has been featured on various television series as guest appearances. In 2019, Griñón competed and eventually won the fourth season of the competitive reality cooking show MasterChef Celebrity España. After winning the show, she continued her television work with food and co-presented Cocina al punto con Peña y Tamara with renowned chef Javier García Peña. She pursued formal culinary training at Le Cordon Bleu in Madrid, Spain, and finished her studies in June 2021.

In September 2020, Griñón joined the cast of the Spanish variety talk show El Hormiguero as a co-presenter in its round table discussion portion, along with Pablo Motos, Juan del Val, Cristina Pardo, and Nuria Roca. In January 2021, she joined the talent competition show El Desafío as a judge.

At the death of her father, The Marquess of Castel Moncayo, in March 2020 due to complications from COVID-19, she succeeded to his junior title the Marquisate of Griñón according to his will.

Filmography

Television

Personal life 
Griñón has publicly stated that she is a practicing Roman Catholic and shares that she was influenced by her the maternal grandmother, Beatriz Arrastia Reinares's daily attendance of mass. She is the baptismal godmother of her nephew Miguel Verdasco Boyer, son of her maternal younger half-sister, Ana Boyer Preysler with Spanish professional tennis player Fernando Verdasco Carmona.

Griñón was in a romantic relationship with Spanish hospitality executive Íñigo Onieva Molas from November 2020 until September 2022.

References 

1981 births
Living people
Spanish nobility
Spanish socialites
Marchionesses